This is the alphabetical categorised list of statewide, regional and local political families involved in the politics and various elections of Haryana state of India at state (Haryana Legislative Assembly) and national level (Lok sabha).

Critique of dynastic political clans of Haryana

Present status

Characteristics of political dynasties: ideology-less self-serving hegemony of caste and region based dynasties

The political dynasties of Haryana are not driven by the ideology, but by the goal of holding the power and keeping the rivals out. Dynastic politicians have unfair advantage from the start of their political career. The dynastic political clans of Haryana are often criticised for the infamous self-serving politics of the Aaya Ram Gaya Ram turncoats who notoriously engage in the frequent party switching, political horse trading, unholy political alliances, political corruption, political cronyism, nepotistic-dynastic rule which serves their own clan more than it serves their voters and people of Haryana they ought to serve.

Congress and regional parties are more dynastic than BJP and communists

 
Though dynasties exist across the left–right political spectrum of political continuum, the self-professed centrist Congress and regional parties are more dynastic than the right-wing BJP or the left-wing communists.
 
In 2019 Lok Sabha elections, there were at least 8 dynasts grandchildren, great grandsons and sons of ex-CMs of Haryana, all of them were the usual suspects, i.e. Lal trio clans, Hooda-Birender clan and Rao-Yadav clan. Of total 10 seats from Haryana, the highest number of dynasts candidates were from Congress 9 (2 from Hooda clan, Shruti Chaudhary from Bansi Lal clan, Bhavya Bishnoi from Bhajan Lal clan, Kumari Selja, Kuldeep Sharma, Tanwar), followed by 2 from Devi Lal clan (Digvijay and Arjun Chautala), and 2 from BJP (Bijender Singh and Rao Inderjit).

Consequences of dynastic politics in Haryana

Proliferation of dynasties keeps people poorer

A data based scientific empirical research, which studied the impact of dynastic politics on the level of poverty of the provinces, found a positive correlation between dynastic politics and poverty i.e. the higher proportion of dynastic politicians in power in a province leads to higher poverty rate. There is significant evidence that these political dynasties use their political dominance over their respective regions to enrich themselves, using methods such as graft or outright bribery of legislators. Even relatively richer provinces could not become truly richer due to the dynastic politics.

Dynasties' conflict-of-interest creates corruption 

Since the political dynasties hold significant economic power and their interests are overrepresented due to dynastic politics, it leads to the conflicts of interests and corruption. , 120 (22%) of India's 542 parliament members were accused of various crimes under India's First Information Report procedure. Many of the biggest scandals  have involved high level government officials, including Cabinet Ministers and Chief Ministers, such as the 2010 Commonwealth Games scam, the Adarsh Housing Society scam, the Coal Mining Scam, the Mining Scandal and the Cash for Vote scams. The industries most vulnerable to corruption as: government-run social development projects, infrastructure development & real estate projects, mining, aerospace & defence, and Power & Utilities (2013 EY and 2011 KPMG). India ranked at 78th place out of 180 in the 2018 Corruption Perception Index and more than 50% of Indians had at some point or another paid a bribe to a public official to get a job done (Transparency International,  2008). 
 
The negative impact of dynasties on the economy and wealth of province can be explained by the "Carnegie Effect" named after the industrialist Andrew Carnegie who donated all his wealth for philanthropy to non-family members, because he believed the dynasts have less incentive of working hard if they are assured of inherited power, connections and wealth. Political dynasties prefer status quo and develop self-serving interests largely different from the interests of voters they ought to be serving. Dynastic candidates, being almost exclusively from the upper classes, are naturally biased towards defending their own vested interests.

Misuse of state resources by dynasties for self-promotion

In a blatant act of self-promotion by misusing state institutes, the Bhupinder Singh Hooda led Congress, the most prolific dynastic party of India and Haryana, introduced a chapter titled "Haryana Ke Gaurav" (Pride of Haryana) in the curriculum of class V to teach students about the political dynasties in a glorified light i.e. highlighted only the positive aspects of dynast leaders related to top 5 prolific dynasties of the state, e.g. Devi Lal and Bansi Lal, Chotu Ram and Ranbir Singh Hooda, etc. Based on the recommendations by a committee that had members of NCERT and SCERT in 2016 this chapter was removed by the BJP government led by the Chief Minister Manohar Lal. It was replaced by a new chapter titled "Gaurav Gatha" (Glorious Legends), which replaced the dynast leaders with the freedom fighters non-dynast leaders of national stature, including the greats such as Bhagat Singh, Vallabhbhai Patel, Lala Lajpat Rai and Lokmanya Tilak to name a few. To reinforce their political image and lineage to gain unfair "instant recognition" for multiple generations, dynasts engage in wastage of government resources and taxpayer's money, for example erecting numerous statues of the dynast leaders, naming multiple institutes and schemes after the same dynastic leaders of own clan, etc.; this money could have been better spent on the welfare of poor and the development of the state. To reverse and prevent this, there have been demands for the "anti-dynasty laws" and the "anti-dynasties pro-martyrs institution naming policies" to specifically exclude the dynasts and politicians, and to include the martyrs and the non-political prominent achievers in the specific area.
 
To keep the rivals out of power and to prevent the rise of emerging challengers, the political dynasties often misuse state agencies, police, vigilance bureau, false cases with planted evidence to persecute and harass their rivals in each district and village in a psychopathic manner.

Dynasties prevent the rise of talented non-dynasts 

Dynastic politicians tend to be generally less capable compared to non-dynastic politicians, because of their reliance on dynastic connections rather than academic and professional competence for their position.  Unethical practices of nepotism and cronyism have negative consequences because the truly qualified and talented people have to face injustices and it eventually leads to corruption and brain drains which creates the social discrimination. Research has found that the dynast members of parliament (MPs) are less likely to have served at the grassroots politics, such as panchayat elections, than the non-dynastic MPs. Political dynasties collude to maintain the status quo, by preventing the non-dynastic better-skilled more-capable challengers/candidates being elected to the power. This in turn leads to the bureaucratic inefficiencies and underdevelopment, the lack of accountability and transparency in governance, and the resistance to adoption of new progressive-transformative ideas needed for the faster-paced development.

Sustaining and perpetuating the dynasties

Rise of political dynasties caused by the creation of family-controlled self-serving despotic non-democratic parties in democracy which breed nepotistic parasitic patron-psychophants hegemony. Dynasties sustain and perpetuate their power by the collaboration of competing dynasties aimed at maintaining their mutual hegemony and preventing the rise of others as new political challengers. The collaborating dynasties do so by building strong friendly and family ties outside the politics (usually inter-marrying across rival parties) to sustain each other, while keeping the facade of being the political adversaries.

Keeping the bastards honest

"Keep the bastards honest" (KTBH) is a popular political slogan in which the "bastards" refer to the major parties and/or politicians in general. To "keep the bastards honest" means "to hold a government to their promises" and "to look at both sides and choose the best." In political sense it also means, an individual activist, civil society, NGOs or a smaller party holding accountable both the party in power as well as the major opposition parties, i.e. blind support of or alliance with none, but proactively offering the issue based support or opposition in the larger interest of the nation and society. One can not keep the bastards honest when they themselves are not honest or if they themselves are a bigger bastard than the entities they are trying to hold accountable, e.g. have views to the extreme side of either party. This slogan was coined by the Australian Democrats leader Don Chipp as his party's aim, which became a long-lived slogan. To "Keep the bastards honest" is not a cover for or a form of frequent floor crossing, party switching, political horse trading or altering own ideology; it is a form of the political transparency and the conscience voting in line with the pre-established and pre-stated ideology.

Decline and demolition of dynasties

Parties go in decline with the death of the chief patron, internal squabbling for power among the members of controlling-family, rise of new non-dynastic charismatic leaders, anti-dynasty disgust among the voters with the increased literacy rate in the country, rising aspirations of the politically aware non-dynastic masses and civil society. Dynasties can be reduced and eliminated by implementing the anti-dynasty laws, stringent conflict of interest laws, stringent laws for the transparency in governance and party operations, mandatory intra-party democracy law as a precondition for maintaining the ongoing registration of the party, laws limiting the number of terms for the elected representatives and party officials, laws limiting the number of simultaneous candidates from the same families, laws to enforce a cooling period between the generations of dynasties for the entry into politics, developing grassroot leadership, institutionalised mechanism for the progression of grassroot leaders into state and national politics e.g. mandatory for MLA and MP to have served at panchayat or municipal level, strengthening the institutionalised role of the civil society in the enforcing the accountability and transparency in governance.

Statewide rampant dynasts

Five rampant and large dynasties over several generations have hogged Haryana's politics since the formation of Haryana, namely: Lal trio, Hooda-Birender Singh clan, Pandit B.D. Sharma clan and Rao-Yadav clan.

Pandit Bhagwat Dayal Sharma

All notable politicians like Bansi Lal, Bhajan Lal and Sushma Swaraj learned politics under Panditji.

He was also known as Bhishm pitmaha of Haryana politics.

Lal trio of Haryana
All the Lal trio started their politics from Congress party, became turncoats, often founding, merging, splitting and switching parties.

Bhagwat Dayal Sharma clan of Haryana 
 B. D. Sharma, ex-Chief Minister, Minister of Labour in Punjab, Punjab Congress president (1963-1966), Chief minister Haryana (1966-1967), Rajya Sabha member (1968-1974), Lok Sabha member (1977 from Karnal), Governor of Orissa and Madhya Pradesh from 1978 to 1984.
 Rajesh Sharma, elder son of Bhagwat Dayal Sharma, ex-Minister Labour and Employment, Sports and Youth Affairs from 1982 to 1987, 1991-1996 respectively.
 Mahadev Sharma, Younger son of B. D. Sharma ex-vice president INLD, currently member of Congress Haryana.

Bansi Lal clan

This clan, once dominant at the state level, is now declining and limited only to Bhiwani Lok Sabha and Tosham assembly seats.

 Bansi Lal, ex-Chief Minister Haryana.
 Ranbir Singh Mahendra, elder son of Bansi Lal, ex-MLA from Mundhal Khurd, ex-President of BCCI lost from Badhra assembly in 2009 and 2014.
 Sumitra Devi, Bansi Lal's daughter who contested 2014 Loharu assembly election against her sister's husband Sombir Singh which both lost.
 Sombir Singh Sheoran, Bansi Lal's son-in-law and husband of Bansi Lal's daughter Savita, ex INC MLA, contested and lost 2014 Loharu assembly election.
Surender Singh, son of Bansi Lal, ex-Member of Parliament from Bhiwani.
 Kiran Choudhry, wife of Surender Singh, MLA from Tosham.
 Shruti Choudhry, Daughter of Surender Singh, Member of Parliament from Bhiwani-Mahendragarh.

Bhajan Lal clan

This clan, once dominant at the state level, is now declining and struggling to retain their traditional hold on Hisar Lok Sabha and Adampur assembly seats.

 Bhajan Lal, ex-Chief Minister Haryana
 Jasma Devi, wife of Bhajan Lal, contested for MLA
 Chander Mohan, son of Bhajan Lal, ex-Deputy Chief Minister of Haryana
 Kuldeep Bishnoi, son of Bhajan Lal
 Renuka Bishnoi, wife of Kuldeep Bishnoi, MLA from Adampur
 Bhavya Bishnoi, son of Kuldeep and Renuka, MLA from Adampur
 Dura Ram, nephew of Bhajan Lal and cousin of Kuldeep and Chander Mohan Bishnoi, was INC MLA from Fatehabad Vidhan Sabha constituency.

Devi Lal's Chautala clan

This clan is originally from Rajasthan and not from Haryana. In the 19th century, Devi Lal's grandfather Teja Ram Sihag (belonging to the 'Sihag' clan of Jats, but that surname is generally not used) came from Bikaner in Rajasthan and settled in Teja Khera village of Sirsa district. Teja Ram had three sons: Deva Ram, Asha Ram and Hukam Ram. Asharam had two sons, Lekhram and Tara Chand. Lekhram had two sons, Sahib Ram and Devi Lal. Due to Devi Lal, the obscure farming family became a political dynasty.

Sahib Ram was the first politician from the family to be elected as MLA in 1938, under British rule. Fourteen years later, in 1952, Devi Lal followed in his footsteps, by becoming MLA. Devi Lal had four sons, namely Partap Singh, Om Prakash Chautala, Ranjit Singh and Jagdish Chander. Partap Singh was MLA in the 1960s, Ranjit Singh was a Congress MP, Om Prakash Chautala became Chief Minister, and Jagdish died young, before he could join politics.

Om Prakash Chautala has two sons, Ajay Singh Chautala and Abhay Singh Chautala. Both have been MLA and MP. Devi Lal's numerous grandsons, greatgrandsons and other family members are also in politics, such as Aditya Devilal, Dushyant Chautala and his brother Digvijay Chautala as well as their cousin Arjun Chautala. This clan, once dominant at the state level and now in decline due to divisions and internal family squabbling in the large clan, is struggling to revive their statewide hold while still retaining some pockets of influence in Hisar and Sirsa area.

Sahib Ram Sihag, Devi Lal's elder brother, first politician from the family, Congress MLA from Hisar in 1938 and 1947. 
Ganpat Ram, son of Sahib Ram
Kamalvir Singh, grandson of Sahib Ram and son of Ganpat Ram. He contested several times on a Congress party ticket for the state assembly from the Dabwali constituency. 
Devi Lal, Ex-Deputy Prime Minister of India and two times Chief Minister of Haryana. He started from Congress, first became Congress MLA in Haryana in 1952, later co-founded and split many parties, and finally founded his own Indian National Lok Dal.
Partap Singh, eldest son of Devi Lal, INLD MLA in the 1960s. 
Ravi Chautala, son of Partap Singh Chautala. His wife, Sunaina Chautala, is General Secretary of the INLD party.
Jitendra Chautala. Not involved in politics.
Om Prakash Chautala, second son of Devi Lal, Ex-Chief Minister of Haryana, President of family-run INLD. He was convicted and is presently in prison for political corruption. He and his wife Smt. Snehlata Devi are blessed with two sons.
Ajay Singh Chautala, elder son of Om Prakash Chautala. State General secretary, INLD. Convicted and imprisoned for the political corruption along with his father
Naina Singh Chautala, wife of Ajay Singh Chautala, MLA from Dabwali.
Dushyant Chautala, elder son of Ajay Singh and Naina Chautala, Member Lok Sabha. Current deputy CM of Haryana.
Digvijay Chautala, younger son of Ajay Singh and Naina Chautala, contested and lost the 2019 lok sabha elections
Abhay Singh Chautala, younger son of Om Prakash Chautala, MLA for Ellenabad
Kanta Chautala, wife of Abhay Chautala. She contested Zila Parishad poll in Sirsa, but lost to her brother-in-law Aditya Devilal Chautala.
Karan Chautala, elder son of Abhay Singh Chautala.
Arjun Chautala, younger son of Abhay Singh Chautala, contested and lost 2019 lok sabha elections
Ranjit Singh Chautala, third son of Devi Lal. Member of the Haryana Legislative Assembly.
Late Sandeep Chautala.
Gagandeep Chautala. Works closely with his father in politics.
Jagdish Chunder Chautala, fourth and youngest son of Devi Lal. He died at a young age, but left behind three sons to succeed him.
Aditya Devilal Chautala, grandson of Devi Lal and son of Jagdish. Member of the BJP. Defeated Kanta Chautala, wife of his cousin brother Abhay, and got elected to the Zila Parishad of Sirsa district.
Aniruddh Chautala
Abhishek Chautala
Amit Sihag (Chautala), grandson of Devi Lal, 2019 haryana MLA from Dabwali.

Chhotu Ram clan 

Chhotu Ram Ohlan, was the founder of the Unionist Party and a Revenue Minister in Punjab govt., these branches are descended from or related to him. He had no son, his nephew Sri Chand became his political successor and his son-in-law Neki Ram (husband of Chottu Ram's daughter and father of Birender Singh) became prominent politician in Jind area.

 Sri Chand, nephew of Chottu Ram, MLA and speaker of Haryana assembly in 1967.

Birender Singh/Sheokand clan

This clan is related to Chotu Ram.

 Neki Ram Sheokand, son-in-law of Chotu Ram, former MLA & Minister in the joint Haryana & Punjab Government.
 Chaudhary Birender Singh Sheokand, son of Neki Ram and grandson of Chottu Ram,  5 times MLA, 4 times MP, Union Minister for Steel, former President of Haryana Congress, nephew of Ranbir Singh Hooda and cousin of Bhupinder Singh Hooda
 Premlata Singh Sheokand, wife of Birender Singh, MLA Uchana Kalan
 Brijendra Singh Sheokand, son of Birender and Premlata, nephew of Bhupinder Singh Hooda, MP in 2019 Lok Sabha.

Hooda Clan 
Origin of this political dynasty is related to Chaudhary Matu Ram Hooda, an Arya Samajist. Hooda's traditional sphere of influence originates from Rohtak and sometimes extends to Sonepat and Jhajjhar.
 Ranbir Singh Hooda, MLA, Member of Lok Sabha & Rajya Sabha, Ex-Minister of Punjab & Haryana
 Inderjit Singh Hooda, son of Ranbir Singh, contested 1982 Haryana assembly election as INC candidate
 Bhupinder Singh Hooda, son of Ranbir Singh, Ex Chief Minister of Haryana, former President of Haryana Congress, former Leader of Opposition (Haryana), under investigation in courts for several cases of political corruption
 Deepender Singh Hooda, son of Bhupinder Singh, Member Lok Sabha, member of Congress Young Brigade

Rao clan of Ahirwal
Ahirwal region of South Haryana has 11 assembly seats spread across 3 districts (Rewari, Gurugram and Mahendragarh) and 3 Lok Sabha seats, and politics of this region of various parties is hogged by the turncoat-politician descendants of Rao Tula Ram who often compete with each other in elections while otherwise remaining united in keeping new challengers out.

Following claim either direct descent or from the clan of Rao Tula Ram.

Ajay Yadav clan
This clan claims descent from Rao Tula Ram. This clan is also related to the Lalu Prasad Yadav.
 Rao Abhey Singh, MLA
 Ajay Singh Yadav, son of Rao Ahey Singh, 6 times MLA from Rewari, MP, union minister
 Chiranjeev Rao, son of Ajay Singh Yadav who is married to Lalu Prasad Yadav's daughter Anushka, foreary General Secretary of Haryana Congress, Congress-RJD Corrdinator for Bihar 2015 assembly polls,
 Abhimanyu Rao, paternal nephew of Ajay Singh Yadav and paternal grandson of Rao Abhey Singh, convener of the AICC's OBC Department Indian National Congress Party. 
 Aayushi Rao, wife of Abhimanyu Rao, sarpanch) of Saharanwas village in Rewari district

Rao Birender clan

 Rao Balbir Singh, MLA in Punjab assembly from 1921 to 1941.
 Rao Birender Singh, Son of Rao Balbir Singh, claims direct descent from Tula Ram, 2nd Chief Minister Haryana.
 Sumitra Devi, daughter of Rao Balbir Singh and sister of Rao Birender Singh, sister of Rao Birender Singh, defeated Rao Abhay Singh from Rewari in 1967.
 Rao Shoe Raj Singh, son of Rao Balbir Singh and brother of Rao Birender, lost elections from Rewari to Rao Abhay Singh in 1972.
 Rao Inderjit Singh, son of Rao Birender Singh, 3 times MP from Gurgaon and union Minister of State, turncoat from INC to BJP.
 Rao Yadavendra Singh, son of Rao Birender Singh and younger brother of Rao Inderjit Singh, Ex-MLA from Kosli
 Rao Ajit Singh, son of Rao Birender Singh and younger brother of Rao Inderjit Singh, lost to Ajay Singh Yadav in 1989 lok sabha elections.

Rao Mohar clan

 Rao Mohar Singh, was related to family of Tula Ram, Former MLA Ahirwal in the Punjab Government 1942.
 Rao Mahveer Singh, Rao Mohar Singh's son, 3 time Former MLA & Minister in the joint Haryana & Punjab Government.
 Rao Vijay veer Singh, Rao Mahveer Singh's son, Former MLA Sohna
 Rao Narbir Singh, Rao Vijay veer Singh's son, Two time MLA & Minister in the Haryana Government.
 Rao Dan Singh, 2019 INC MLA is related to Rao narbir Singh as Dan Singh's son Akshat Singh is married Narbir's daughter.

Sub-state/regional dynasts
These clans hog the politics only in some burrows of the state, and the clan has contested elections from two or more districts.

Bhadana-Gurjar clan of South Haryana
 Avtar Singh Bhadana, Current MLA from Mirapur Assembly, Uttar Pradesh, 4 Times MP from Faridabad, Former MP from Meerut and Former Minister in Haryana Cabinet
 Kartar Singh Bhadana, brother of Avtar Singh Bhadana, Former Cabinet Minister in Haryana Cabinet, former MLA from Samalkha(Haryana) and Khatauli, Uttar Pradesh

Dalbir-Selja clan of reserved constituencies
This clan mainly hogs the politics of Sirsa and Ambala.
 Chaudhary Dalbir Singh, MLA, MP and union minister from INC
 Selja Kumari, daughter of Chaudhary Dalbir Singh, former MP and union minister from INC

Jindal clan of Hisar-Kurukshetra
This industrial clan, a perfect example of industrialist-politicians nexus and conflict of interests, mainly hogs the politics of Hisar and Kurukshetra lok sabha as well as Hisar assembly seats.

 Om Prakash Jindal, 3 times INC MLA from Hisar assembly and once power minister of Haryana was one of the richest persons in India. 
 Savitri Jindal, wife of Om Prakash Jindal who is former INC MLA from Hisar assembly and a former minister in haryana govt is the richest women of India
 Naveen Jindal, son of Om Prakash Jindal and 2 times INC MP from Kurukshetra.

Shankar Dayal Sharma clan
These political branches greatly benefited from their relationship with former Indian President Dr. Shankar Dayal Sharma. There are many more from his lineage in the national politics, only following branches are active in Haryana.

Tanwar-Maken clan
This branch of clan hogs INC politics of Sirsa.
 Lalit Maken, father of Avantika Maken and grand son-in-law of Dr. Shankar Dayal Sharma 
 Ashok Tanwar, son-in-law of Lalit Maken, husband of Lalit's daughter Avantika Maken who is maternal grand daughter of former Indian President Dr. Shankar Dayal Sharma, Tanwar lost several elections from Sirsa and has been 1 time MP from Sirsa

Local district-level dynasts
These clans hog the politics only in a certain district or assembly seat.

ChiranjiLal-Kuldeep Sharma clan of Karnal
This clan mainly hogs the politics of Karnal.
 Chiranji Lal Sharma, 4 times MP from Karnal.
 Kuldeep Sharma, son of Chiranji Lal Sharma and 2 times INC MLA from Teh-Ganaur in Sonipat district,

Kanda clan of Sirsa
This clan mainly hogs the politics of Sirsa city.
 Murli Dhar Kanda, contested India's first General Election on Jan Sangh ticket, father of Gopal Goyal Kanda. 
 Gopal Goyal Kanda, son of Murli Dhar Kanda and 2019 MLA in Haryana.

Mann Chaudhary's clan of Gogdipur

This clan hogs politics of assembly seats of Indri in Karnal and Pai in Kaithal.
 Ch. Randhir Singh Mann, leader of the unionist party. 
 Janki Mann, Wife of Randhir Singh Mann, 1 time MLA from Indri. 
 Ch. Surjit Singh Mann, Son of Randhir Singh Mann, 3 time MLA from Indri, Minister in Chaudhary Bansi Lal's cabnet.
 Ch. Randeep Singh Mann, Son of Surjit Singh Mann, lost MLA election. 
 Tejinder Pal Mann, Nephew of Randhir Singh Mann, 2 time MLA from Pai.

Meo muslim clans of mewat

Ahmed clan of Nuh
This clan mainly hogs the politics of Nuh constituency in mewat area.
 Kabir Ahmed was elected MLA twice.
 Khurshid Ahmed, son of Kabir Ahmed, was a minister in Haryana three times, winning his last election in 1996.
 Aftab Ahmed, son of Khurshid Ahmed, had been INC MLA from Nuh and a minister in Haryana govt.

Hussain clan of Nuh
This clan mainly hogs the politics of Nuh constituency in mewat area.
 Mohammad Yaseen Khan, MLA in the Punjab Legislative Assembly for 30 years since 1926.
 Choudhary Tayyab Husain, son of Mohammad Yaseen Khan, was an MP and MLA, Minister in the undivided state of Punjab, Rajasthan and Haryana.
 Zakir Hussain, son of Tayyab Hussain, Previously BJP MLA from Nuh (city) Vidhan sabha Constituency.
 Zahida Hussain, daughter of Tayyab Husain and sister of Zakir Hussain, several times INC MLA of Kaman constituency in mewat region of Rajasthan adjoining Haryana.
 Shahnaaz Khan, Zahida's daughter and Tayyab Husain granddaughter, a medical doctor and was elected sarpanch from village Garhazan in Rajasthan in Mewat region on Haryana-Rajasthan border. 
 Haneef Khan, paternal grandfather of Shahnaaz Khan and father-in-law of Zahida Hussain, sarpanch for 55 years. 
 Jalees Khan, son of Haneef Khan, Zahida Hussain's husband and father of Shahnaaz Khan, elected head of block panchayat.

Shakrulla-Naseem clan of Ferozepur Jhirka 
This clan mainly hogs the meo politics of Ferozepur Jhirka constituency in mewat area on Haryana-Rajasthan border.
 Shakrulla Khan, 3 times MLA from Ferozepur Jhirka constituency.
 Naseem Ahmed, son of Shakrulla Khan, INLD MLA from Ferozepur Jhirka constituency who turned turncoat and joined BJP.

Surjewala clan of Jind-Kaithal areas
This clan mainly hogs the politics of Jind-Kaithal-Narwana area in mid-north Haryana.
 Shamsher Singh Surjewala, 5 times MLA, 1 time MP, minister in Haryana govt, from INC
 Randeep Surjewala, son of Samsher Singh Surjewala, 2 times MLA and one time minister in Haryana,

Vinod Sharma clan of Ambala
This branch of clan hogs INC politics of Ambala.
 Venod Sharma, brother of Shyam Sunder Sharma who is married to the daughter of Shankar Dayal Sharma and father of Manu Sharma who was convicted for murder of Jessica Lal, former INC MLA and Rajaya Sabha MP, been a turncoat with own party.
 Shakti Rani Sharma, wife of Venod Sharma and mother of Manu Sharma, lost 2014 assembly election from Ambala.

See also

 Similar lists
 Political families of India 
 List of political families
 Related topics
 Politics of Haryana
 Elections in Haryana
 Electoral reform in India

 Related concepts
 Crossing the floor
 Cronyism
 Horse trading
 Party switching
 Political corruption
 Political nepotism
 Turncoat

References

 
Haryana